Frederic Lauriston Bullard (May 13, 1866 – August 3, 1952) was an American Christian minister and later an editorialist who won the 1927 Pulitzer Prize for Editorial Writing for his work in the Boston Herald entitled "We Submit", which argued for a retrial in the Sacco and Vanzetti case.  He also wrote several books regarding Abraham Lincoln.

References

External links
 F. Lauriston Bullard: Lincoln Scholar, Pulitzer Prize Winner, Book Thief,

1866 births
1952 deaths
College of Wooster alumni
American opinion journalists
American columnists
People from Wauseon, Ohio
Pulitzer Prize for Editorial Writing winners
Yale University alumni
Journalists from Ohio